Ace High is a 1918 American silent Western film directed by Lynn Reynolds and starring Tom Mix, Lloyd Perl and Lewis Sargent.

Plot 
Jean Rivard (Tom Mix) is a heroic Canadian Mountie who rescues his childhood sweetheart Annette Dupre (Kathleen O'Connor) from the clutches of an American sheriff. Action takes place primarily at a saloon called the Ace High. The bar is a popular hangout for criminals because at a moment's notice, it can be slid across the room from the United States into Canada, or vice versa as necessary.

Cast
 Tom Mix as Jean Rivard 
 Lloyd Perl as Jean Rivard (age 10) 
 Lewis Sargent as Jean Rivard (age 15) 
 Kathleen O'Connor as Aneette Dupre 
 Virginia Lee Corbin as Annette Dupre (child) 
 Lawrence Peyton as Jack Keefe 
 Colin Chase as Baptiste Dupre 
 Jay Morley as Harvey Wright 
 Pat Chrisman as Louis Cartier

Themes 
Set along the Alaska-Canadian border, the film explores the arbitrariness of legality on the fringes of nation-states through the cliche of the heroic Mountie saving a girl from a villainous sheriff.

Production 
Ace High was the second of 17 Tom Mix feature films Lynn Reynolds directed over an eight-year period. The film was the first of three Tom Mix films shot in the Big Bear area.

References

External links
 

1918 films
1918 Western (genre) films
1910s English-language films
American black-and-white films
Films directed by Lynn Reynolds
Fox Film films
Silent American Western (genre) films
1910s American films